Newtown, Queensland may refer to:
 Newtown, Queensland (Ipswich)
 Newtown, Queensland (Toowoomba)